Aaron Kelly (born April 20, 1986) is a former Canadian football wide receiver.

College career
Aaron Kelly spent three seasons with the Clemson Tigers. In his first two seasons he was primarily utilized as a big possession receiver. In his junior year, he had over 1,000 yards and 11 touchdown receptions. In his following senior year, his yardage fell to 722 with only 4 touchdowns.

Professional career

Atlanta Falcons
After going undrafted in the 2009 NFL Draft Kelly was signed by the Atlanta Falcons. He was released prior to the start of the 2009 NFL season. The New Orleans Saints held a workout with Kelly midway through the season, but he was ultimately not signed.

Hamilton Tiger-Cats
Kelly signed with the Hamilton Tiger-Cats of the Canadian Football League in time for the 2011 CFL season. In his first year in the league, Kelly recorded 383 receiving yards and two touchdowns. Kelly's second season in the league was less productive, he only played in 6 of the 18 games and only recorded 107 yards and 1 touchdown. On May 23, 2013, Kelly was released by the Hamilton Tiger-Cats following the acquisition of WR Lyle Leong.

Winnipeg Blue Bombers
On August 27, 2013, Kelly signed with the Winnipeg Blue Bombers of the Canadian Football League. He was signed mid-season, Week 9, to replace a heavily injured Bombers receiving corps. In the remaining nine games of the season Kelly caught 22 passes for 321 yards, with zero touchdowns. In the first game of the 2014 CFL season, Kelly had his best single game performance of his career. It was his first time with 100 receiving yards in a game, doing so on five receptions, two of which were for touchdowns. He would go on to finish the 2014 campaign with career highs in receptions (43), yards (549) and touchdowns (3). Kelly became a free agent on February 10, 2015.

Toronto Argonauts
On the day before 2015 training camps opened, May 30, 2015, Kelly signed with the Toronto Argonauts.

References

External links
Winnipeg Blue Bombers bio
Toronto Argonauts bio

1986 births
Living people
American football wide receivers
Arizona Rattlers players
Canadian football wide receivers
Clemson Tigers football players
Edmonton Elks players
Hamilton Tiger-Cats players
Milwaukee Iron players
Sportspeople from Marietta, Georgia
Players of American football from Marietta, Georgia
Toronto Argonauts players
Winnipeg Blue Bombers players